Delbern Acres is an unincorporated community located in the town of Fox Lake, Dodge County, Wisconsin, United States. The community is located on the north shore of Fox Lake.

Notes

Unincorporated communities in Dodge County, Wisconsin
Unincorporated communities in Wisconsin